Braddley Tovosia (born 10 April 1967 in Sukiki Village, Guadalcanal) is a Solomon Islands politician.

He studied at Betikama College up to Form 5.

His career in national politics began when he was elected to Parliament as the member for East Guadalcanal in the August 2010 general election, standing as an independent candidate. He was then appointed Minister for Provincial Government and Institutional Strengthening in Prime Minister Danny Philip's Cabinet. On 22 January, in a Cabinet reshuffle prompted by the resignation of several ministers, Tovosia was promoted to the position of Minister for Forestry. When Gordon Darcy Lilo replaced Philip as Prime Minister in November 2011, Tovosia was reshuffled to the Fisheries portfolio. On or around 1 March 2012, Tovosia was reshuffled again, becoming Minister for Public Service, exchanging his portfolio with Alfred Ghiro. On 22 October, Tovosia was reshuffled to the position of Minister for the Environment, replacing John Moffat Fugui who had left the government.

Notes and references

1967 births
Living people
Members of the National Parliament of the Solomon Islands
People from Guadalcanal Province
Forestry ministers of the Solomon Islands
Environment ministers of the Solomon Islands
Fisheries and Marine Resources ministers of the Solomon Islands